Scopula butleri  is a moth of the  family Geometridae. It was described by Prout in 1913. It is found in the north-eastern Himalaya, Sumatra, China, Japan and Borneo. The habitat consists of lowland forests and lower montane forests.

The length of the forewings is 7–8 mm.

Subspecies
Scopula butleri butleri (north-eastern Himalaya, Sumatra, China, Japan)
Scopula butleri aequibrachiata Holloway, 1997 (Borneo)

References

Moths described in 1913
Moths of Asia
butleri
Taxa named by Louis Beethoven Prout